Ianthi-Maria Tsimpli (born 2 February 1964) is a British linguist and Chair of English and Applied Linguistics at the University of Cambridge.
She is an associate editor of the journal Glossa and was elected a fellow of the British Academy in 2021.

Books
 The Mind of a Savant: Language Learning and Modularity (1995, Blackwell)

References

External links
 Ianthi-Maria Tsimpli

Living people
1964 births
Linguistics journal editors
Fellows of the British Academy
Academics of the University of Cambridge
Alumni of University College London